Thomas Griffiths (1867–1955) was a Welsh trade union official and Labour Party politician, he was a Member of Parliament for Pontypool from 1918 to 1935.

Early life
Griffiths was born in 1867 in Neath, Wales and was educated at the Melyn Voluntary School. In 1899 at the age of 32 Griffiths became a student at the newly opened Ruskin College in Oxford, England. In his home town he worked in the local steel industry and also served on Neath Town Council.

Politics
He was appointed a Divisional Officer of Iron and Steel Trades Confederation and in the 1918 General Election he became the Member of Parliament for Neath. Between 1919 and 1925 he was a Labour Party Whip and in 1924 he briefly became the Treasure of the King's Household.

Private life
He married Mary Elizabeth Morgan in 1891 and they had a son and a daughter, he died aged 87 in Oxford, England on 4 February 1955.

External links

References

1867 births
1955 deaths
Alumni of Ruskin College
Iron and Steel Trades Confederation-sponsored MPs
Welsh Labour Party MPs
People from Neath
Treasurers of the Household
UK MPs 1918–1922
UK MPs 1922–1923
UK MPs 1924–1929
UK MPs 1931–1935
Welsh trade unionists